Chamaraja Wodeyar VIII (Bettada Chamaraja Wodeyar VIII Bahadur; 27 August 1759 – 6 September 1776.) was the twentieth maharaja of the Kingdom of Mysore from 1770 for six years until 1776. He reigned under the powerful control of Sarvadhikari Hyder Ali.

Life
He was the second son of Krishnaraja Wodeyar II and succeeded on the death of his elder brother Nanjaraja Wodeyar on 2 August 1770.

See also
Wodeyar dynasty

1759 births
1776 deaths
Kings of Mysore
Chamaraja VIII
18th-century Indian royalty